The 15th annual Nuestra Belleza México pageant, was held at the Arena Monterrey of Monterrey, Nuevo León, Mexico on September 20, 2008. Thirty-three contestants competed for the national title, which was won by Karla Carrillo from Jalisco, who later competed in Miss Universe 2009 in The Bahamas. Carrillo was crowned by outgoing Nuestra Belleza México titleholder Elisa Nájera. She was the second Jalisciense to win this Title.

The Nuestra Belleza Mundo México title was won by Perla Beltrán from Sinaloa, who later competed in Miss World 2009 in South Africa where she was the 1st Runner-up. Beltrán was crowned by outgoing Nuestra Belleza Mundo México titleholder Anagabriela Espinoza. She was the second Sinaloense to win this Title.

As the Suplente/1st Runner-up the Nuestra Belleza Internacional México 2009 title was won by Laura Zúñiga from Sinaloa, and she would compete in Miss International 2009 in China, but was dethroned on December 25, 2008.  She was the second Sinaloense to win this T.

This year was the 15th anniversary of Nuestra Belleza México Organization, and on the final night thirteen ex-Queens were invited to the event. The Recognition "Corona al Mérito 2008" was for Priscila Perales, Nuestra Belleza México 2005, Semifinalist in Miss Universe 2006 and Miss International 2007.

Results

Placements

Order of Announcements

Top 15
Sinaloa
Sinaloa
Nuevo León
Baja California
Querétaro
Guanajuato
Chiapas
Tabasco
Oaxaca
Baja California
Aguascalientes
Sonora
San Luis Potosí
Jalisco
Baja California Sur

Top 10
Sinaloa
Chiapas
Baja California
Sonora
Guanajuato
Querétaro
Sinaloa
Nuevo León
Baja California Sur
Jalisco

Top 5
Baja California 
Jalisco
Sonora
Sinaloa
Sinaloa

Preliminary Competition
The Preliminary Competition was held at the Arena Monterrey of Monterrey, Nuevo León, Mexico a few days before to Final Competition. Prior to the final telecast, all contestants competed in swimsuit and evening gown as part of the selection for the others top 10 finalists who were revealed during the beginning of the two-hour live telecast of the Nuestra Belleza México 2008 Pageant live on Televisa on September 20.

The Preliminary Competition was hosted by Silvia Salgado and Patricio Cabezut.

Special Awards

National Costume Competition
In this competition the contestants are not evaluated, only the costumes. It is a competition showing the country's wealth embodied in the colorful and fascinating costumes made by Mexican designers combining the past and present of Mexico.

For the Nuestra Belleza México Organization this event is very important because it discloses the creative work of the great Mexican designers and also elects the costume to represent Mexico in Miss Universe the next year. Also, some costumes are elected to represent Mexico in other beauty contests.

The winning costume designer receives the "Aguja Diamante Award".

  - "Doncella Matlazinca"
  - "Reina PaiPai"
  - "México Florece"
  - "Fiesta Mexicana"
  - "Tierra Azteca"
  - "Raíces de México"
  - "Malinche"
  - "Diosa Teotihuacana"
  - "India Colimota"
  - "Culturas Vivientes de mi Tierra"
  - "Raíces de mi Tierra"
  - "Campesina"
  - "Princesa Náhuatl"
  - "El Pescador"
  - "Toltecáyotl, Herencia a México"
  - "Raíces"
  - "Diosa Michoacana"

  - "Entre Águilas"
  - "Pasión Norteña
  - "Diosa del Maíz"
  - "Quechquemitl, Elegante Mujer Huasteca"
  - "Platería Mexicana"
  - "Charrería Mexicana" (Competed in Miss Universe 2009)
  - "Tehuana Dorada" (Competed in Miss International 2008)
  - "La Fertilidad"
  - "Mujer del Istmo"
  - "Aguas de Tabasco"
  - "Pantanos de Centla"
  - "Sacerdotisa Huasteca"
  - "Quinto Sol"
  - "Tesoros de mi Tierra"
  - "Alegoria Maya"
  - "Mestiza, Pureza de la Mujer"

Judges

Preliminary Competition
 Priscila Perales - Nuestra Belleza México 2005 & Miss International 2007
Alberto Santos - Businessman
Blanca Soto - Nuestra Belleza Mundo México 1997, Miss Verano Viña del Mar 1997, International Top Model
 Norberto Núñez - TV Director & Producer
Carolina Morán - Nuestra Belleza Mundo México 2006
Francisco Contreras - Fashion Coordinator
Rebecca Solano - TV Producer
 Juan José Origel - Journalist & Show Host

Final Competition
Alberto Santos - Businessman
Blanca Soto - Nuestra Belleza Mundo México 1997, Miss Verano Viña del Mar 1997, International Top Model
Carla Estrada- TV Producer
Carolina Morán - Nuestra Belleza Mundo México 2006
Gabriel Soto - El Modelo México 1996 & Actor
 Juan José Origel - Journalist & Show Host
 Norberto Núñez - TV Director & Producer
 Priscila Perales - Nuestra Belleza México 2005 & Miss International 2007
 Salvador Mejía - TV Producer

Background music
Opening Number: "Medley of the host State" by Contestants
Swimsuit Competition: "Un Gancho al Corazón", "Tu Voz" by Playa Limbo
Evening Gown Competition: "Zenith" by Telefunka
Crowning Moment: "Nuestra Belleza México" (Official Theme)

Titleholders celebration
As part of the pageant 15th Anniversary, 16 Nuestra Belleza México titleholders from the first pageant in 1994 to the outgoing and current titleholders were in attendance.

Alejandra Quintero - Nuestra Belleza Mundo México 1995
Katty Fuentes - Nuestra Belleza México 1997
Blanca Soto - Nuestra Belleza Mundo México 1997
Vilma Zamora - Nuestra Belleza Mundo México 1998
Jacqueline Bracamontes - Nuestra Belleza México 2000 (as presenter)
Rosalva Luna - Nuestra Belleza México 2003
Dafne Molina - Nuestra Belleza Mundo México 2004
Priscila Perales - Nuestra Belleza México 2005
Karla Jiménez - Nuestra Belleza Mundo México 2005
Carolina Morán - Nuestra Belleza Mundo México 2006
Elisa Nájera - Nuestra Belleza México 2007 (as outgoing titleholder)
Anagabriela Espinoza - Nuestra Belleza Mundo México 2007 (as outgoing titleholder)
Lorenza Bernot - Nuestra Belleza Internacional México 2008 (as outgoing titleholder)
Karla Carrillo - Nuestra Belleza México 2008 (as current titleholder)
Perla Beltrán - Nuestra Belleza Mundo México 2008 (as current titleholder)
Laura Zúñiga - Nuestra Belleza Internacional México 2009 (as current titleholder)

Contestants

1 Nadia Ramos was going to compete in 2007 but had to leave the competition due to a family emergency and given the opportunity to participate this year.

Designates
 - Nadia Ramos
 - Patricia Castañeda
 - Perla Beltrán
 - Stephanie Díaz

Returning states

Last competed in 1999:

Last competed in 2002:

Last competed in 2006:

Withdrawals
 Estado de México

Significance
Jalisco won the Nuestra Belleza México title for the second time (before 2000).
This year the crown of Nuestra Belleza México suffers his fifth change, this new model would continue until 2009.
Sinaloa won the Nuestra Belleza Mundo México title for the second time (before 2000), the Nuestra Belleza Internacional México title also for the second time (before 1999) and Suplente/1st Runner-up for the third time (before 1999 and 2000)
This year marks 15 years of the contest and so it was invited thirteen ex-beauty queens who modeled in private gateway.
It was the first mentioned the name of the winner of Nuestra Belleza Internacional México.
For the first time a Titleholder was dethroned to the title (Laura Zúñiga, Nuestra Belleza Internacional México 2009).
Perla Beltran's crown fell to the ground after she congratulated her colleagues on stage, suffering major damage.
For the fourth time an Afro-Mexican compete in the Nuestra Belleza México pageant (Ángeles Aguilar from Oaxaca, before 1999, 2001 and 2005).
Guerrero return to competition after two years (2006), Hidalgo and  Tabasco after three years (2005) and Oaxaca after nine years (1999).
Jalisco was placed for fifth consecutive year in the Top 5.
Jalisco and Nuevo León placed for sixth consecutive year.
Sonora placed for third consecutive year.
Chiapas and Guanajuato placed for second consecutive year.
Oaxaca returned to making calls to the semifinals after twelve years (1996), Baja California Sur after eight years (2000),  Querétaro and Tabasco after six years (2002), San Luis Potosí after four years (2004), Aguascalientes after three years (2005) and Baja California and Sonora after two years (2006).
States that were called to the semifinals last year and this year failed to qualify were Colima, Chihuahua, Distrito Federal, Morelos, Tamaulipa, Veracruz and Yucatán.
For the second time Alfredo Adame hosted Nuestra Belleza México, with Jacqueline Bracamontes who was her fourth time.
Sinaloa won Miss Top Model and Contestants' Choice for the first time and Best Hair for the second time (before 1994).
Nuevo León won Miss Talent for the first time.
Baja California won Miss Sports for the second time (before 2005).
Querétaro won the Academic Award and Best National Costume for the first time.
Jalisco won Fuller Beauty Queen for the first time.
The host delegate, Mariana González from Nuevo León, placed to finalists.
Sonora (Cecilia Montaño) is the higher delegate in this edition (1.84 m).
Campeche (Nazli Gantús), Distrito Federal (Fernanda Maldonado), Guerrero (Natali Bastidas), Michoacán (Alexis Navarro) and Yucatán (María Esther Magadán) are the lower delegates in this edition (1.70 m).

Contestants notes
 - Kimberly Herrera had been Reina Nacional de la Feria de San Marcos 2008 in Aguascalientes. She is the sister of Estefanía Herrera Nuestra Belleza Aguascalientes 2010.
 - Paulina Hernández competed in the Miss Continente Americano 2009 pageant held in Centro de Convenciones Simón Bolívar in Guayaquil, Ecuador on September 26, 2009, but she didn't place.
 - Marliese Edelmann represented Mexico in the international Miss Costa Maya International 2009 pageant, held in La Isla Bonita, San Pedro, Belize on August 7 of that year. Despite being one of the favorites to win the crown, she made the semifinals, ending her participation as the 2nd Runner-up of the year. Also she represented Mexico in Miss Fox Sports 2010 pageant in Miami, Florida, United States to be the image of the company, where she was semifinalist.
 - Nadia Renpenning is cousin of Katherine Renpening Señorita Chihuahua 1987.
 - Margarita Favela is sister of Mexican actress Marlene Favela.
 - Andrea Martínez competed in Reina Hispanoamericana 2009 held in Parque Urbano in Santa Cruz, Bolivia on October 29, 2009, but she didn't place. She won the Best National Costume award.
 - Karla Carrillo represented Mexico in the international Miss Universe 2009, held in Imperial Ballroom of the Atlantis Paradise Island in Nassau, Bahamas on August 23 of that year. She failed to make the top fifteen, ending Mexico's five year streak of consecutive placements in Miss Universe, from 2004 through 2008. On September 18, 2010 represented Mexico in Miss Continente Americano 2010 held in Palacio de Cristal in Guayaquil, Ecuador and placed as the 1st Runner-up.
 - Mariana González is a television hostess on TV Azteca.
 - Ana Catherina Castrejón was born in Tulancingo, Hidalgo and was the Local Director of Nuestra Belleza Querétaro to 2010 - 2012.
 - Laura Zuñiga won the title as Reina Hispanoamericana 2008 held at the Manzana Uno in Santa Cruz, Bolivia on October 30, 2008. On December 23, 2008, she was arrested in Zapopan, Jalisco, along with seven men who allegedly carried illegal guns and US$53,000 in cash. The arrest was made by the state police and army officers. Zúñiga declared that she was kidnapped by her boyfriend Ángel Orlando García Urquiza, apparently a leader of the Juárez Cartel, and that she was unaware of his illicit activities. On December 25, 2008, a second statement was released announcing that Zúñiga has been stripped of her title as Nuestra Belleza Internacional México 2009 and Reina Hispanoamericana 2008.  Zúñiga was released from the detention center on January 30, 2009, after the judge found no evidence that tied her to any criminal activity. Actually she works as Model in United States and Mexico.
 - Perla Beltrán had been Miss Earth Sinaloa 2007 and competed in Miss Earth México 2007 and obtained second place (Miss Air). She was the Suplente/1st Runner-up of Nuestra Belleza Sinaloa 2008 but she was invited by the national organization to compete in the contest of this year, obtaining the right to represent Mexico in Miss World 2009 held at the Gallagher Convention Centre in Johannesburg, South Africa on December 12, 2009 . She won Miss World Top Model fast track event and award, enabling her to advance to the semifinals. She had placed among the Top 12 in the Beach Beauty fast track event. Beltrán obtainted the title of Miss World Americas and placed as 1st Runner-up during the final competition of Miss World 2009. Also she was crowned as Miss Grand Slam 2009 by Globalbeauties.com, she also placed in Top 10 Face of the Year, was named Sexiest in Americas and placed in the Top 5 Sexiest Woman Alive. Missosology.com name her Queen of the World Cup, a non official nor related to FIFA or Miss World pageant, poll involving the 32 delegates from the countries playing in the South Africa 2010 FIFA World Cup. Actually she is a businesswoman, in late 2011, she opened her own boutique called "Perla Beltrán Boutique". Actually she is the new State Coordinator of Nuestra Belleza Sinaloa.
 - Cecilia Montaño competed in the Miss Continente Americano 2011 pageant held at the Palacio de Cristal in Guayaquil, Ecuador on October 22, 2011, where she was the 1st Runner-up.
 - Ángeles Aguilar is sister of Elsa Aguilar, Nuestra Belleza Oaxaca 1999 also is the daughter of Agustin Aguilar Roca, who was Mr. Oaxaca in 1972, as well as Ángeles del Puerto Muñoz, who represented Oaxaca in Señorita Mexico in 1968. She represented Mexico in Reina Hispanoamericana 2010 held in ExpoCruz in Santa Cruz, Bolivia on November 25, 2010, but she didn't place. She is the first Afro-Mexican to represent Mexico at this pageant. She is the Local Director of Nuestra Belleza Oaxaca.

Crossovers
Contestants who had competed or will compete at other beauty pageants:

Miss Universe
 2009: : Karla Carrillo

Miss World
 2009: : Perla Beltrán (1st Runner-up)

Miss Continente Americano
 2009: : Paulina Hernánez
 2010: : Karla Carrillo (1st Runner-up)
 2011: : Cecilia Montaño (1st Runner-up)

Miss Costa Maya International
 2009: : Marliese Edelmann (2nd Runner-up)

Reina Hispanoamericana
 2008: : Laura Zúñiga (Winner/Dethroned)
 2009: : Andrea Martínez
 2010: : Ángeles Aguilar

Miss Earth México
 2007: : Perla Beltrán (Miss Air/1st Runner-up)

Reina de la Feria de San Marcos
 2008: : Kimberly Herrera (Winner)

Miss Grand Slam 2009
 2009: : Perla Beltrán (Winner)

Miss Fox Sports
 2010: : Marliese Edelmann (Top 10)

References

External links
Official Website

.Mexico
2008 in Mexico
2008 beauty pageants